Chester A. Kowal (August 17, 1904 – September 28, 1966) was an American politician, a basketball player, a boxer and a World War II veteran. From 1962 to 1965 he was mayor of Buffalo, New York; he was the last non-Democratic mayor of that city until Byron Brown temporarily switched parties in 2021.

He was born into a Polish-American family in Buffalo on August 17, 1904.  The family operated a grocery store at 55 Gittere Street. He attended Hutchinson Central High School.  He turned down a basketball scholarship to Canisius College in Buffalo in order to play professionally to earn money. He played with the once world champion German Orioles and the Buffalo Lincolns basketball teams, and also played semi-pro baseball with the Easter Brands.  He boxed with the Western New York AAU  and was a contender for the U.S. Olympic boxing team. He was married to a Polish-American woman, Stephanie Adamski. His family started Walden Bottling Works in 1924; he managed the company in his spare time.

In late 1942, he enlisted in the United States Army Air Forces as a private and was sent to Officers' Training School. He saw service in the U.S. Southwest before serving five months in the Pacific Theater during World War II. In April 1946 he was discharged as a lieutenant-colonel. He was active in veterans organizations.

In 1951, Kowal was elected Buffalo city comptroller on the Republican ticket.  He was defeated in his run for mayor in the 1957 election by Frank A. Sedita, but prevailed in the mayoral election held on November 7, 1961.  He served a single term as mayor.   On September 28, 1966, he died in his sleep.

References

American politicians of Polish descent
Mayors of Buffalo, New York
New York (state) Republicans
1904 births
1966 deaths
20th-century American politicians
United States Army Air Forces personnel of World War II
Military personnel from Buffalo, New York
United States Army Air Forces officers
United States Army colonels